The Moldova is a river in Romania, in the historical region of Moldavia. It is a right tributary of the river Siret. The river rises from the Obcina Feredeu Mountains of Bukovina in Suceava County and joins the Siret in Cotu Vameș, east of the city of Roman in Neamț County.

The river gave its name to the Principality of Moldavia, whose first capital, Târgul Moldovei (now Baia), is on the Moldova River but its etymology is disputed.

Towns and villages

The following towns and villages are situated along the river Moldova, from source to mouth: Moldova-Sulița, Câmpulung Moldovenesc, Vama, Voroneț, Gura Humorului, Păltinoasa, Baia, Roman.

Tributaries

The following rivers are tributaries to the river Moldova (from source to mouth):

Left: Sulița, Benia, Breaza, Pârâul Negru, Moroșani, Pârâul Cailor, Timoi, Sadova, Deia, Lala, Moldovița, Doabra, Beltag, Tocila, Humor, Bucovăț, Corlata, Șomuz, Medisca, Hatia, Lețcani, Cristești, Boura, Petroaia (or Ciohoranca), Valea Baciului, Ciurlac

Right: Lucina, Lucava (or Lucova), Tătarca, Răchitiș, Gârbele, Orata, Delnița, Colac, Arseneasca (or Arseneasa), Putna, Colbul (or Izvorul Giumalăului), Prașca, Seaca, Izvorul Alb, Izvorul Malului, Valea Caselor, Șandru, Sălătruc, Suha, Voroneț, Isachia, Bălăcoaia, Valea Seacă, Suha Mică, Suha Mare, Sasca Mare, Bogata, Râșca, Seaca, Râșca, Sărata, Neamț (or Ozana), Topolița, Umbrari, Valea Albă (or Soci), Valea Mare, Viar

References

Maps 
 Maps Munceii Neamțului - Munții Stânișoarei
 Tourist map, Parcul Vânători-Neamț

Rivers of Romania
 
Rivers of Suceava County
Rivers of Neamț County
Roman, Romania